Stephen P. MacMillan is the  chairman, president and chief executive officer of Hologic, a medical device and diagnostic manufacturer headquartered in Marlborough, Massachusetts.  He is the former CEO of Stryker Corporation,  a medical device manufacturer headquartered in Kalamazoo, Michigan.

Education
MacMillan received a B.A degree in Economics from Davidson College, where he was co-captain of the golf team.  He is also a graduate of Harvard Business School's Advanced Management Program. MacMillan serves on the Davidson College Board of Trustees.

Career
MacMillan was the chief executive officer of Stryker Corporation from 2005 to 2012 and president from 2003 until his resignation in February 2012. In November 2012, he was named CEO of sBiomed, a Utah-based company. On December 9, 2013, MacMillan was named president and chief executive officer of Hologic. He also joined Hologic's board.

References

External links
Portfolio.com

American chief executives of manufacturing companies
Davidson College alumni
Living people
Year of birth missing (living people)